Mr. Wong is an American adult animated series which debuted in 2000 and lasted 13 episodes (an unaired 14th episode was made available for the DVD release). It centers around the misadventures of Wong, an elderly Chinese American butler, and the wealthy socialite WASP he works for (and endures racial abuse from), Miss Pam. He previously worked as a butler for Bing Crosby and often mourns him.  It developed a cult following whilst being hosted on the website Icebox.com. The cartoon also drew fierce criticism from the Asian American community, who viewed it as racist.

Mr Wong'''s creators, Pam Brady and Kyle McCulloch, also write for the television series South Park.
The DVD was released under the "National Lampoon's Presents" banner.

The music for Mr. Wong was composed and performed by Fuzzbee Morse.

The theme song was sung by former Monkees lead singer Davy Jones.

List of episodes

Film

In September 2000 a direct to video film adaptation of Mr. Wong called "Crap Attack" was in negotiation between IceBox Incorporated and Artisan Entertainment, however, when the film was publicly announced by Artisan president Bill Block the National Council of Asian Pacific Americans initiated a letter-writing campaign that successfully convinced Artisan to drop the project. The Coalition later took out an advertisement in Daily Variety criticizing the cartoon and thanking Artisan for abandoning the movie project.

Reception

The series had a negative reaction from critics in the mainstream media and Asian American groups, yet maintained a limited cult following. Scott Bass of Streaming Media described the comedy of Mr. Wong'' as "so edgy" that he could not "imagine seeing it on TV."

References

External links

2000 web series debuts
2000s American adult animated television series
Television characters introduced in 2000
Fictional Han people
Asian-American issues
Asian-American culture
Fictional servants
Ethnic humour
Stereotypes of Asian Americans
Stereotypes of East Asian people
Animation controversies in television
Race-related controversies in animation
Race-related controversies in television
Mr. Wong
American flash animated web series
American adult animated web series
National Lampoon (franchise)
Television series created by Pam Brady